At the 1936 Summer Olympics, seven fencing events were contested, six for men and one for women.

Medal summary

Men's events

Women's events

Medal table

Participating nations
A total of 311 fencers (270 men and 41 women) from 29 nations competed at the Berlin Games:

References

 
1936 Summer Olympics events
1936
1936 in fencing
International fencing competitions hosted by Germany